The 2006 WNBA season was the eighth season for the Minnesota Lynx. The Lynx played horribly all season, leading them to dead last in the West and a franchise-worst of 10-24.

Offseason

Expansion Draft
Stacey Lovelace-Tolbert was selected by the Chicago Sky in the draft.

WNBA Draft

The Detroit Shock traded Ambrosia Anderson to the Lynx during the draft.

Regular season

Season standings

Season schedule

Player stats

References

Minnesota Lynx seasons
Minnesota
Minnesota Lynx